Feroponera is a monotypic Afrotropical genus of ants in the subfamily Ponerinae containing the single species Feroponera ferox. The genus is known only from a few specimen collected from an unoccupied termitary in Cameroon.

References

External links

Endemic fauna of Cameroon
Ponerinae
Monotypic ant genera
Hymenoptera of Africa